United Feature Syndicate (UFS) is a large American editorial column and comic strip newspaper syndication service based in the United States and established in 1919. Originally part of E. W. Scripps Company, it was part of United Media (along with the Newspaper Enterprise Association) from 1978 to 2011, and is now a division of Andrews McMeel Syndication. United Features has syndicated many notable comic strips, including Peanuts, Garfield, Li'l Abner, Dilbert, Nancy, and Marmaduke.

History
United Feature Syndicate was formed in 1919. From 1922 to 1958, United Features was the column, feature (and comics) division of Scripps' United Press Association. Authors syndicated by United Features in its early years included Frank A. Vanderlip, Octavus Roy Cohen, David Lloyd George, Vicente Blasco Ibáñez, Herbert Hoover, Sinclair Lewis, Benito Mussolini, Édouard Herriot, and Heywood Broun.

It became a dominant player in the syndication market in the early 1930s. In March 1930, United Features acquired the Metropolitan Newspaper Service (ostensibly from the Bell Syndicate). And in late February 1931, Scripps acquired the New York World, which controlled the syndication arms of the Pulitzer company: World Feature Service and Press Publishing Co. (which unlike other syndicates were owned by the paper rather than being separate entities).

The Metropolitan Newspaper Service acquisition brought over the comic strips Tarzan and Ella Cinders. The World Feature Service acquisition brought over the comic strips The Captain and the Kids, Everyday Movies, Fritzi Ritz, Hawkshaw the Detective, Joe Jinks, and Little Mary Mixup. From this point, United Features became a successful distributor of newspaper comics, for the first time distributing color Sunday strips. An April 1933 article in Fortune described United Features as one of the "Big Four" American syndicates (along with King Features Syndicate, Chicago Tribune Syndicate, and the Bell Syndicate).

In 1934, United Features launched its first original strip, Al Capp's Li'l Abner. As Li'l Abner's popularity increased, creator Capp lampooned United Features in his strip-within-a-strip, Fearless Fosdick, which featured the abusive and corrupt "Squeezeblood Syndicate."

Robert M. Hall was a sales manager at United Features starting in 1935; he left in 1944 to start the Post Syndicate.

From 1936 to 1954, United Feature published their own line of comic books, using their comic strip features as characters. Lev Gleason, who in the 1940s and 1950s  published a number of popular comics titles, was an editor at United Feature in the beginning, including the company's first title, Tip Top Comics. Three United Feature titles published more than 100 issues: Tip Top Comics (188 issues, Apr. 1936–Sept./Oct. 1954), Sparkler Comics (120 issues, July 1941–Nov./Dec. 1954), and Comics on Parade (104 issues, Apr. 1938–Feb. 1955). The company even created its own original superheroes: Iron Vic, Mirror Man, and Spark Man (none of whom caught on). After ending the United Feature comics line in 1954, a few of their titles would be continued by St. John Publications. The rest of their comic book properties were acquired by Dell Comics in 1958.

In 1968, United Features syndicated about 50 features to 1500 clients.

In 1972, United Features Syndicate acquired and absorbed the North American Newspaper Alliance and the Bell-McClure Syndicate into its operations.

In May 1978 Scripps merged United Feature Syndicate and the Newspaper Enterprise Association to form United Media Enterprises. United Media continued to syndicate strips under the United Feature Syndicate brand.

In 1994, Jim Davis's company, Paws, Inc., purchased the rights to Garfield (including the strips from 1978 to 1993) from United Features. The strip is currently distributed by Andrews McMeel Syndication, while rights for the strip remain with Paws.

On February 24, 2011, United Media struck a distribution deal with Universal Uclick (now known as Andrews McMeel Syndication) for syndication of the company's 150 comic strip and news features, which became effective on June 1 of that year. While United Media effectively ceased to exist, Scripps still maintains copyrights and intellectual property rights. The United Feature Syndicate brand still continues to be used on many strips.

United Feature Syndicate comic strips

Current United Features strips

Branded UFS 
 Drabble by Kevin Fagan (launched 1979)
 F Minus (launched 2002; entered syndication 2006)
 Get Fuzzy by Darby Conley (launched 1999)
 Health Capsules originally by Dr. Michael Petti and Jud Hurd; then by Bron Smith (launched 1961)
 Jump Start by Robb Armstrong (launched 1989)
 The Knight Life by Keith Knight (launched 2008)
 Lola by Todd Clark (2005–present) — acquired from Tribune Media Services, where it launched in 1999
 Marmaduke originally by Brad Anderson (c. 1970–present) — acquired from National Newspaper Syndicate where it launched in 1954
 Monty by Jim Meddick (launched 1985)
 Nancy originally by Ernie Bushmiller (launched 1938)
 Prickly City by Scott Stantis (launched 2004)
 Rip Haywire by Dan Thompson (launched 2009)
 Ripley's Believe It or Not! (1989–present) — acquired from King Features Syndicate; originally launched 1918
 Rose Is Rose originally by Pat Brady (launched 1984)
 Shortcuts by Jeff Harris (launched 1999)
 Tarzan originally by Hal Foster (1932–2001) — acquired from Metropolitan Newspaper Service where it launched in 1929; in reprints
 Uncle Art's Funland originally by Art Nugent (launched 1933) — acquired from Bell-McClure Syndicate in 1972

Branded Andrews-McMeel 
 9 Chickweed Lane by Brooke McEldowney (launched 1993)
 Betty by Gary Delainey and Gerry Rasmussen (launched 1991)
 Brevity, currently by Dan Thompson (launched January 3, 2005)
 The Buckets originally by Scott Stantis (1994–present) — acquired from Tribune Media Services where in launched in 1990
 Frazz by Jef Mallett (launched 2001)
 Garfield by Jim Davis (June 19, 1978 – 1993; moved to Universal Press Syndicate, which is now part of the same company that owns United Features)
 Graffiti by Gene Mora (launched May 3, 2011)
 Grand Avenue originally by Steve Breen; now by Mike Thompson (launched 1999)
 KidSpot by Dan Thompson (launched 2011)
 KidTown by Steve McGarry (launched 2011) — formerly known as KidCity
 Luann by Greg Evans (1996–present) — acquired from North America Syndicate, where it launched in 1985
 Off the Mark by Mark Parisi (launched 1987)
 Over the Hedge by Michael Fry & T. Lewis (launched 1995)
 Peanuts by Charles M. Schulz (1950–2000) — in reprints
 Pearls Before Swine by Stephan Pastis (launched 2001)
 Reality Check by Dave Whamond (launched 1995)
 World of Wonder by Laurie Triefeldt (launched 2000)

Former and concluded United Features strips 

 Abbie an' Slats by Al Capp and Raeburn Van Buren (July 12, 1937 – January 30, 1971)
 Alice in Wonderland by  Edward D. Kuekes and Olive Ray Scott (1934-1935) — based on the Lewis Carroll book
 Ask Shagg by Peter Guren (1980–1995; moved to Creators Syndicate)
 Back Home Again by Ed Dodd (1930 – 1945)
 Berry's World by Jim Berry (1963 – 2003)
Billy Make Believe by Harry E. Homan (begun 1934; end-date uncertain)
 Biography (June 1, 1986–1991) by John Roman (1986–1989) and Steve McGarry (1989–1991)
 Broncho Bill by Harry O'Neill (1928–1950) and then Fred L. Meagher (1950–1956) — originally Young Buffalo Bill (1928–c. 1930), then Buckaroo Bill (c. 1930–1932), then Broncho Bill (1932–1955), then Buffalo Bill (1955–1956); an early Western strip about a group called The Boy Rangers
 The Captain and the Kids by Rudolph Dirks and later John Dirks (1919–1979) — acquired from World Feature Service in 1931
 Casey Ruggles by Warren Tufts (1949 – 1954)
 Committed by Michael Fry (1994 – 2006)
 Condorito originally by René Pepo Ríos (13 August 1949 – 1993; moved to Universal Press Syndicate)
 Cow and Boy by Mark Leiknes (2006–2012)
 Cynical Susie by Laverne Harding and "Becky Sharp" (Helen Sharp) (1933–c. 1937)
 Dickey's Dogs (also known as Buddie and his Friends, Just Dogs, and then after being acquired by UFS, Mr. and Mrs. Beans and then Buster Beans) by Robert L. Dickey (July 14, 1919 – July 21, 1940) — acquired in 1930 from Metropolitan Newspaper Service
 Diesel Sweeties by Richard Stevens III (January 2007 – August 2008) — returned to web distribution
 Dilbert by Scott Adams (1989–2011; moved to Universal Uclick/Andrews McMeel Syndication, where it continues today)
 The Doings of the Duffs originally by Walter R. Allman, then Ben Batsford & Buford Tune (1928 – 1931; originated with the Newspaper Enterprise Association in 1925)
 Off the Leash by W. B. Park (1989–1999)
 Oh! Margy by John Held Jr. (April 6, 1924 – May 22, 1927)
 Ophelia and Jake by Heidi Stetson (January 25, 1988 – August 18, 1991)
 Queen of the Universe by Sam Hurt (1990–1992)
 Race Riley and the Commandos by Milburn Rosser (1940s)
  The Real-Great Adventures of Terr’ble Thompson!, Hero of History, by Gene Deitch (October 16, 1955 – April 14, 1956)
 Rudy by William Overgard (January 3, 1983 – December 22, 1985)
 Rudy Park by Theron Heir and Darrin Bell (2011–c. 2011; moved to Washington Post Writers Group, where it concluded in 2018)
 Secret Asian Man by Tak Toyoshima (July 16, 2007 – September 19, 2009)
 Skylark by Elmer Woggon (1929)
 Spot the Frog by Mark Heath (January 5, 2004 – July 5, 2008)
 Spunkie by Loy Byrnes (December 16, 1940 – March 21, 1942)
 Star Hawks by Gil Kane and Ron Goulart (c. 1979 – May 2, 1981) — inherited from NEA, where it launched in 1977)
 The Sunshine Club by Howie Schneider (October 6, 2003 – 2007; in reruns)
 Suzie View by Tauhid Bondia and Erik McCurdy (September 2004 – March 8, 2005)
 Tailspin Tommy by Hal Forrest (1940–1942; continued from Bell Syndicate where it was launched in 1928)
 There Oughta Be a Law! (c. 1972–c. 1984) by Frank Borth, Warren Whipple, and Mort Gerberg — acquired from Bell-McClure Syndicate, where it was launched in 1944
 Tubby by Doc Winner (March 19, 1923 – June 5, 1926) 
 Twin Earths by Oskar Lebeck and Alden McWilliams (1952–1963)
 Up Front by Bill Mauldin
 U.S. Acres (AKA Orson's Farm or Orson's Place) by Jim Davis (1986 – 1989)
 Wee Pals (1970s–c. 1987; moved to Creators Syndicate) — came over from Lew Little Enterprises
 Wright Angles by Larry Wright (1976-1990)

United Feature comic books (selected) 

 The Captain and the Kids (17 issues, 1949–1953)
 Comics on Parade (104 issues, Apr. 1938–Feb. 1955)
 Curly Kayoe (7 issues, 1946–1950)
 Fritzi Ritz (15 issues, 1949, Mar./Apr. 1953–Sept./Oct. 1954) — continued by St. John Publications
 Nancy and Sluggo (8 issues, 1949–1954) — continued by St. John Publications
 Single Series (30 issues, 1938–1942)
 Sparkle Comics (33 issues, Oct./Nov. 1948–Dec. 1953/Jan. 1954)
 Sparkler Comics (120 issues, July 1941–Nov./Dec. 1954)
 Tip Top Comics (188 issues, Apr. 1936–Sept./Oct. 1954) — continued by St. John Publications
 Tip Topper Comics (28 issues, Oct./Nov. 1949–Apr./May 1954)
 United Comics (19 issues, 1950–Jan./Feb. 1953)

Syndicated editorial cartoons
 Matt Bors
 Bill Day
 Jerry Holbert
 Mike Lester
 Henry Payne
 Ed Stein

Syndicated columns

 A+ Advice for Parents: Helping Your Child Succeed in School by Leanna Landsmann
 The Aces on Bridge by Bobby Wolff
 Among Friends by Tad Bartimus
 Animal Doctor by Michael Fox, D.V.M.
 Ask Mr. Know-It-All by Gary Lee Clothier
 From Consumer Reports
 Cook Well, Eat Well by Dana Carpender
 Desperation Dinners by Beverly Mills and Alicia Ross
 Eat in and Save by Marialisa Calta
 First Aid for the Ailing House by Henri deMarne
 Frugal Living by Sara Noel
 Dr. Gott by Peter Gott
 Harper's Magazine
 The Harvard Medical School Adviser
 The Housing Scene by Lew Sichelman
 Dick Kleiner
 Harvey Mackay
 Mary Mitchell
 Miss Manners by Judith Martin
 The New Republic
 NextSteps by Jan L. Warner and Jan K. Collins
 On Nutrition by Ed Blonz
 Parent-to-Parent by Betsy Flagler
 Parenting by the staff of Parenting magazine
 Salon
 Smart Money by Bruce Williams
 Soap Opera Review by Nancy Johnson
 Starlight 
 Sweet Land of Liberty by Nat Hentoff
 Talking Money with Jean Chatzky
 Tune in Tomorrow by Nancy Reichardt
 Tune in Tonight by Kevin McDonough
 Diana West
 workplace911 by Bob Rosner
 World Almanac Databank
 You Be the Critic by Bob Habes
 Your Birthday by Stella Wilder
 Your Stars This Week by Stella Wilder

Licensed properties
 El Chavo 
 Precious Moments
 Raggedy Ann

Discontinued features
 Frederick C. by Fred Othman (1948–1949)
 My Day by Eleanor Roosevelt (1935–1962)
 Robert Ruark (late 1940s–early 1950s)
 Skolsky's Hollywood by Sidney Skolsky (1930s–c. 1970s)
 Totem Pole by H. Allen Smith (1940s–1950s)
 Washington Calling by Marquis Childs (1962–c. 1980s)
 Washington Merry-Go-Round by Drew Pearson (1932–1944) and Jack Anderson

References

External links
 
 

Comic strip syndicates
Former E. W. Scripps Company subsidiaries
Mass media companies of the United States
News agencies based in the United States
Mass media companies established in 1919
Comic book publishing companies of the United States
Defunct comics and manga publishing companies